The Hollies is the first EP by The Hollies. It was put out by Parlophone in mono with the catalogue number GEP 8909 and released in the UK in early June 1964. The EP entered the British charts on 6 June 1964 and spent 8 weeks there, peaking at #8 on the Record Retailer chart.

Band originals "What Kind of Love" and "When I'm Not There" were not previously released on an album or single while the covers of "Whatcha Gonna Do 'Bout It" and "Rockin' Robin" were previously released on the band's debut album, Stay with the Hollies.

All the tracks from this EP were first recollected on the See for Miles Records compilation The EP Collection in 1987 and have seen several re-releases since then.

Track listing

Personnel
Allan Clarke — lead singer
Bobby Elliott — drums
Eric Haydock — bass guitar
Tony Hicks — lead guitar, vocals
Graham Nash — rhythm guitar, vocals

External links
E.P. - The Hollies - The Official Hollies Website

Notes

1964 debut EPs
Albums produced by Ron Richards (producer)
The Hollies EPs
Parlophone EPs